Parvodontia is a fungal genus in the family Cystostereaceae. This is a monotypic genus, containing the single species Parvodontia luteocystidia, a crust fungus that grows on bamboo in Brazil.

References

Fungi of South America
Cystostereaceae
Monotypic Polyporales genera
Taxa described in 2004
Taxa named by Leif Ryvarden